Huairou District is situated in northern Beijing about  from the city center (about a 1½ to 2 hour drive).

History
In 1995 during the United Nation's 4th World's Women Conference in Beijing, the Civil Society community was forced to meet in the Huairou district, an hour from the official proceedings, leading to a great deal of discontent, as many of the non-governmental actors present felt marginalized. In a tent at the Civil Society Village established especially for poor, grassroots women at the conference (organized by GROOTS International), the Huairou Commission, a registered non-governmental organization with a global secretariat in Brooklyn, NY, was established to ensure that grassroots women would have a voice at subsequent UN conferences and in other development processes.

Also in 1995, film industry began to develop in Yangsong, a town in the southeast of Huairou. China Film Group Corporation built its studio in Huairou in 2005.

In 2014, another international conference was held in Huairou: the APEC China 2014.

Geography
Because of its 69% forest cover, the district is known as the natural "oxygen bar" of Beijing. In addition, it boasts a rich combination of plant, animal and tourism resources. Therefore, Huairou is of great importance to Beijing in ensuring the environmental quality and the ecosystem of the capital city.

Administrative divisions
There are 2 subdistricts, 12 towns with 3 towns of which carry the "area" label, and 2 ethnic townships in the district:.

Climate

Economy
Its major agricultural products are chestnuts, walnuts, hawthorns, sweet pears, and apricots.

Tourism

The Great Wall of China runs through the district and some of the choicest tourist sections are located in the district. The portion known as Mutianyu is one of the most popular sections of the Great Wall for tourists. The Lakeside Great Wall in Huanghuacheng village, Jiuduhe is another tourist section known for the proximity of the Great Wall to man-made reservoir and even parts of the Great Wall are submerged under the lake water.

Another tourist attraction is Hong Luo Mountain on which the Hong Luo Temple is located.

Film-related attractions are aggregated in Yangsong, including China Film Group studio, Stellar Megamedia studio and Beijing Vintage Car Museum.

Education

Gallery

Notes

References

External links

Official website of Huairou District
Official website of Huairou District 

 
Districts of Beijing